Jess Bradford is a fictional character in the Black Christmas franchise. She is the main protagonist of Bob Clark's seminal slasher film Black Christmas (1974) in which she was portrayed by actress Olivia Hussey. Hussey, known internationally at the time for her role as Juliet in Romeo and Juliet (1968), signed on to the role after a psychic told her that she would be involved in a profitable Canadian film. Despite the dark undertones of the film and the mature themes, Hussey has described shooting the film as a great experience. 

In early stages of the screenplay, she was named Jessica Bradley; this remained her name in the 1976 novelization of the film. She is sourced in numerous academic materials for subverting many prior horror film tropes of the 1960s and prior decades such as the damsel in distress. The character is distinctive for her feminist focused story arc which follows her decision to have an abortion despite the opposition of her estranged boyfriend. This was particularly notable at the time as it followed the 1973 landmark decision Roe v. Wade. This has led to her being a heavily discussed pop culture figure in film studies and the final girl theory. She is the first sole survivor of slasher villain Billy.

Appearances

1974 film
In the original Black Christmas, Jess is a member of the sorority house Pi Kappa Sig. Jess, along with her sorority sisters, began to receive disturbing phone calls from a disorientated man. During a Christmas party, Jess receives another obscene phone call and lets Barb, Phyl, Clare, and several other girls to listen to the incoherent ramblings of the disturbed caller, who does several different voices within each call he makes. The next day, Jess meets with her boyfriend, Peter, to tell him that she is pregnant and getting an abortion which causes him to get upset. Jess later attends a search party to help find a missing girl. After the girl's corpse is found, Jess heads home and receives another phone call. She calls the police, unaware that Peter is in the house until he startles her and argues with her. He leaves as the police come and tap the phone. She manages to keep the caller on the phone long enough for the police to trace the call and they tell her the man is calling from inside the house. 

Jess calls for Phyl and Barb and grabs a fireplace poker and goes upstairs. She discovers the corpses of her friends and then sees the eyes of the caller who reveals himself as Billy looking at her through the door crack, telling her not to "tell what we did, Agnes..." before she slams the door on him. He then chases her downstairs and grabs her hair as she tries to unlock the front door. Jess manages to escape, fleeing to the basement with a fire poker for protection. 

She locks the door just as Billy starts to bang on the door in rage. As Jess wanders the basement, she sees Peter looking into the window, and Jess kills him, believing him to be the killer. The police then hear her screams. They sedate Jess and unknowingly leave her in the house with the real killer, Billy, who is in the attic. Her fate is left ambiguous.

1976 novelization
The character returns in the 1976 Lee Hays novelization although she is known as Jessica Bradley in this adaptation. The story retains the same plot as the film.

Development

Casting
Hussey, who had previously garnered international fame for her role as Juliet in Franco Zeffirelli's Romeo and Juliet (1968), signed on to appear in the film after being told by a psychic that she would "make a film in Canada that would earn a great deal of money". Approached by Clark to portray the lead role of Jess, Hussey agreed and left Los Angeles for eight weeks to film in Toronto, Canada in the winter of 1973. She described shooting the film as a positive experience despite the dark subject matter and stated that she worked well with Clark and two of the other leads, Keir Dullea and John Saxon. While admiring and respecting Margot Kidder as an actress, Hussey revealed she was intimidated by Kidder’s straightforward and serious demeanor she had on set, causing Hussey to keep herself distant from Kidder due to their differing personalities and performing styles.

Design
As the Black Christmas films take place in a winter setting, the characters wear the apt attire. Jess begins the film in a black Christmas jumper that features two large, white hands stitched across the chest worn on top of a yellow collared undershirt and matching pants. 

Later on in the film, she wears a black vest and black bell-bottom jeans over a mustard collared shirt; this outfit is the one most recognized by pop culture and horror fans.

Characteristics 

Academic studies describe Jess as not being entirely reserved. Her characterization is as being timid, intelligent, and very forward-thinking — but not unsociable. These traits of progressiveness and independence are through her decision to have an abortion, despite the opposition of men. She notably doesn't give in to the pressure of changing her decision despite her boyfriend's aggressive attempt at coercion. Theories suggest Jess's grounded demeanor during these scenes of male confrontation prompts the audience's sympathy, particularly for standing her ground. Jess's pregnancy makes her the topic of another heavily discussed concept, Carol J. Clover's final girl theory, which Clover attributes to female survivors being virginal. Jess's pregnancy has led to her description as an anti-thesis to the concept. Jess's engagement in sexual activity and her decision to decline her boyfriend's proposal and reject his persuasion to keep the baby have led to discussions of her having overt feminist undertones — she aspires to have a career. Editor Peter Normanton describes Bradford as being the focus of the film and impacting its outcome. Similarly, Alan-Bertaneisson Jones states that film focuses on Jess rather than the killer and describes her as being a "fully realized character".

Notes

References

Black Christmas (film series)
Christmas characters
Film characters introduced in 1974
Final girls